Lise Anne Couture (born 1959 in Montreal, Canada) is an architect and educator. She is the co-founder of Asymptote Architecture, in partnership with Hani Rashid. She is based in Brooklyn, New York.

Early life and education
Lise Anne Couture was born in 1959 in Montreal, Canada. Couture attended Carleton University and received a bachelor's degree in architecture in 1983. It was at Carleton University she met her future husband and business partner, Hani Rashid. She received a Master's of Architecture degree in 1986 from Yale University.

Architectural work
She is co-founder of the New York-based architecture firm Asymptote Architecture, in partnership with Hani Rashid. The architecture firm was founded in 1989. 

Couture's work as a principal of Asymptote includes: 

 2009 – 166 Perry Street a luxury residential building in Manhattan's West Village
 2009 – Yas Hotel Abu Dhabi in Abu Dhabi, United Arab Emirates
 2002 –  HydraPier Pavilion in Haarlemmermeer, Netherlands.
 1996 – Universe Theater in Aarhus, Denmark
 1997 – Aarhus Museum of Modern Art in Aarhus, Denmark

Teaching 
She has held numerous academic appointments including the Bishop Chair and Saarinen Chair at Yale University, the Muschenheim Fellowship at the University of Michigan, the Kenzō Tange Chair for architecture at Harvard’s Graduate School of Design, and distinguished visiting professorships at Princeton University, the Southern California Institute of Architecture (SCI-Arc), the University of Virginia, l’Université de Montréal, the Barrage Institute in Amsterdam, Parsons School of Design and MIT. She has served on the faculty of Columbia University’s Graduate School of Architecture, Planning, and Preservation.

In 2009 Lise Anne Couture held the Davenport Chair at Yale University as a Visiting Professor and as of this writing, serves as the Baird Visiting Professor at Cornell University’s College of Architecture, Art & Planning as well as a Visiting Professor at Sci-Arc.

Lise Anne Couture has been a New York Foundation of the Arts Fellow. She is a New York State Registered Architect and a member of the AIA. She sits on the Board of Directors of the Architectural League of New York, the Advisory Board of the Builder’s Association and serves on the federal government’s GSA Design Excellence Peer Review Board.

In 2004, Hani Rashid and Lise Anne Couture were presented with the Frederick Kiesler Prize for Architecture and the Arts in recognition of exceptional contributions to the progress and merging of the disciplines and fields of art and architecture.

Publications
 Hani Rashid, Lise Anne Couture: Asymptote. Architecture at the Interval, Rizzoli 1995, 
 Hani Rashid, Lise Anne Couture: Asymptote: Flux, Phaidon Press 2002, 
 Hani Rashid, Lise Anne Couture: Asymptote: Works and Projects, Skira 2002, 
 Hani Rashid, Lise Anne Couture: Asymptote Architecture Actualizations, Asia Art & Design Cooperation 2010,

References

External links
 Lise Anne Couture museum collection at Museum of Modern Art (MoMA)

1959 births
Yale School of Architecture alumni
Living people
University of Michigan fellows
Columbia Graduate School of Architecture, Planning and Preservation faculty